Diocese of Los Ángeles can refer to:

 Roman Catholic Diocese of Los Ángeles, Chile
 Episcopal Diocese of Los Angeles, California
 Roman Catholic Archdiocese of Los Angeles, California
 Coptic Orthodox Diocese of Los Angeles, Southern California, and Hawaii